Stanisław Trzeciak (25 October 1873 – 8 August 1944) was a Polish Catholic priest, social activist, doctor of theology and professor.

Early life 
On May 2, 1923, he was awarded the Officer's Cross of the Polonia Restituta.

In the 1930s, he received the German Order from German Chancellor Adolf Hitler for his exceptionally humane attitude towards German prisoners of war during World War I.

He is considered the leading theoretician of antisemitic action in Poland.

World War II 
In October 1939, he was a founding member of the pro-German, anti-Soviet, and antisemitic National Radical Organization. After the Easter pogrom, however, he broke contact with the organization.

During the German occupation of Poland in World War II, he maintained friendly relations with the Germans, which he used to help his friends. Thanks to his friendly relations with the Germans, he managed to save colonel Ignacy Oziewicz from the camp in Kulautuva, Lithuania. His antisemitic articles were published by occupying forces and quotations from his books were placed on Nazi posters.

During the Warsaw Uprising, he tried to shelter a number of refugees in his church. Shortly afterward, he was shot and killed by a German soldier on 8 August.

References

1873 births
1944 deaths
Polish Roman Catholic priests
Polish collaborators with Nazi Germany
Polish civilians killed in World War II
People murdered in Nazi Germany